Chobi Mela is a biennial international festival of photography held in Dhaka, Bangladesh. It is the largest festival of photography held in Asia.

Description
The outreach programme consisted of mobile exhibitions which went to schools, playgrounds, market places. The exhibitions were accompanied by community liaison staff who explained the context of the show to viewers. Visits to the exhibition by school children and guided tours by curators were also arranged. 

Chobi Mela III was held in Dhaka in 2004.

References

External links
 Official website

Cultural festivals in Dhaka
Photography exhibitions
Photography festivals
Dhaka
Photography in Bangladesh
Arts festivals in Bangladesh